Kisavandan (also Romanized as Kīsāvandān) is a village in Sangar Rural District, Sangar District, Rasht County, Gilan Province, Iran. At the 2006 census, its population was 397, in 119 families.

References 

Populated places in Rasht County